Edgar Corredor (born 24 February 1960) is a Colombian former professional racing cyclist. He rode in four editions of the Tour de France and five editions of the Vuelta a España.

Major results

1982
8th Overall Vuelta a Colombia
1st Stages 1 & 12
1983
1st Stage 1 GP Tell
4th Overall Vuelta a Colombia
1984
3rd Overall Route du Sud
5th Overall Vuelta a España
1985
1st Stage 1 Tour de l'Avenir
1986
5th Overall Vuelta a Colombia
1st Stage 3
7th Overall Circuit Cycliste Sarthe
1987
4th Overall Volta a Catalunya
1988
10th Overall Volta a Catalunya
10th Overall Route du Sud
10th Trofeo Masferrer
1990
3rd Trofeo Masferrer
1991
1st  Overall Vuelta a Aragón
1992
9th Overall Vuelta a Aragón
9th Overall Volta a Portugal

References

External links
 

1960 births
Living people
Colombian male cyclists
People from Sogamoso
Sportspeople from Boyacá Department
20th-century Colombian people